"In a Different Light" (sometimes shortened to "Different Light") is a song written by Bob McDill, Dickey Lee and Bucky Jones, and recorded by American country music artist Doug Stone.  It was released in February 1991 as the fourth and final single from his self-titled debut album.  It peaked at number 1 in both the United States and Canada, thus becoming his first number one hit.

Content
The song is about a male office worker who has a fantasy-come-true about one of his female co-workers, who—despite her apparent youthful appearance—is always bespectacled, her hair in a bun and conservatively dressed in business attire. The protagonist takes note of his male co-workers' lack of interest in the woman, while not letting on (to them) about his social encounters with the woman.

It is during these encounters that the protagonist reveals that "I see you (the co-worker) in a different light," remarking that he had seen the woman with her hair worn long and with "love in [her] eyes," revealing her physical beauty to him.

Chart positions

Year-end charts

References

1991 singles
Doug Stone songs
Songs written by Bob McDill
Songs written by Dickey Lee
Epic Records singles
Song recordings produced by Doug Johnson (record producer)
Songs written by Bucky Jones
1990 songs